Sanketa Nidhi  is a Sanskrit text in verse on the phalita portion of Hindu astrology. It was written by Ramadayalu, the youngest of the four sons of Jaspatimisra Sarman (Sharma) of Amritsar. Ramadayalu completed this book in the year 1860.  It consists of nine Sanketas or chapters. He had dedicated this book to his nephew, Ghasirama Sharma, a son of his brother, Vajircandra (Wazirchand).

Sanketa Nidhi, as written by Ramadayalu, was edited in 1887 by Pt. Ramadutta of Benares, and along with an introduction by Pt. Ramadutta was published in 1911 from Mumbai. It was later published with an English translation by V. Subramanya Sastri in 1944 from Bangalore, its 2nd edition was published in 1976   Yet another English translation and commentary by Gauri Shankar Kapoor was published from New Delhi in 1987   Much before the first publication of its English translation in 1944, a Telugu translation had been published prior to 1923.

Its worth was soon recognised by other Sanskrit scholars well-versed in Hindu astrology such as V.Subramanya Sastri, Gauri Shankar Kapoor, Bangalore Venkata Raman and N.N.Saha.

Sanketa Nidhi does not deviate from Parshari principles and gives the essence of knowledge extracted from more ancient works. In the First Sanketa the author, Ramadayalu, has laid special emphasis on the correct time of birth for the purpose of casting a correct horoscope and given methods for rectifying the time of birth.

References

Hindu astrological texts
Sanskrit texts